Sylvester Randall Derby (February 13, 1892 – June 5, 1974) was an American college football head coach. He coached for two seasons at Lake Forest College in Illinois where he compiled an 8–6–2 overall record. Derby then moved on to coach the Delaware Fightin' Blue Hens football team in 1921 where he finished 5–4 in one season.

Head coaching record

Football

References

External links
 

1892 births
1974 deaths
American football ends
Basketball coaches from Illinois
College men's basketball head coaches in the United States
Delaware Fightin' Blue Hens football coaches
Illinois Fighting Illini football players
Lake Forest Foresters football coaches
Lake Forest Foresters men's basketball coaches
People from Lemont, Illinois
Sportspeople from Cook County, Illinois
Sportspeople from DuPage County, Illinois